The 2013 Kunming Challenger was a professional tennis tournament played on hard courts. It was the first edition of the tournament which was part of the 2013 ATP Challenger Tour. It took place in Kunming, China between 6 and 12 May 2013.

Singles main-draw entrants

Seeds

 1 Rankings are as of April 29, 2013.

Other entrants
The following players received wildcards into the singles main draw:
  Chang Yu
  Gong Maoxin
  Li Zhe
  Ouyang Bowen

The following players received entry as a special exempt into the singles main draw:
  Márton Fucsovics
  Yang Tsung-hua

The following players received entry from the qualifying draw:
  Victor Baluda
  Laurynas Grigelis
  James McGee
  John-Patrick Smith

Doubles main-draw entrants

Seeds

1 Rankings as of April 29, 2013.

Other entrants
The following pairs received wildcards into the doubles main draw:
  Gao Xin /  Li Zhe
  Gong Maoxin /  Zhang Ze
  Tan Haiyun /  Yang Jingzhu

The following pair received entry as an alternate:
  Go Soeda /  Yasutaka Uchiyama

Champions

Singles

 Alex Bogomolov Jr. def.  Rik de Voest, 6–3, 4–6, 7–6(7–2)

Doubles

 Samuel Groth /  John-Patrick Smith def.  Go Soeda /  Yasutaka Uchiyama, 6–4, 6–1

External links

Kunming Challenger
Kunming Challenger
2013 in Chinese tennis